SCM Rugby Timișoara is a professional Romanian rugby union club from Timișoara, which plays in the Liga Națională de Rugby, the first division of Romanian rugby. The team first won the championship in 1972, becoming the first club outside Bucharest to achieve this performance. In the modern format of the SuperLiga, SCM Rugby Timișoara won 4 titles in 6 seasons.
The team is colloquially known as "Universitatea" Timișoara as it has historical ties with the University of Timișoara. In 2014 the club became a partner of London-based Saracens rugby club. In 2020, the club's partnership with London-based Saracens rugby club ended making them change their identity to SCM Rugby Timișoara. SCM Rugby Timisoara`s annual operating budget for the 2020-21 season is approximately 910,000 Euros.

History
In 1949, CSUT (Club Sportiv Universitar Timișoara) played its first match in the city of Sighişoara against the local team, that match was won by CSUT with a score of 34–0, the team from Timișoara having the following line-up: Liteanu, Antonescu, Popa, Nistor, Haller, Onciul, Zomborian, Georgescu (player-coach), Dăncescu, Gurti, Kalincov, Barla, Baruch, Balios and Melinte.

Name change and first National title
Starting with the year 1966 the team changes its name from CSUT to Universitatea Timișoara; Mitică Antonescu was in charge of the team at that point. The year 1966 was the start of the ascension for the team from Timișoara. In the 1968–69 championship the team occupies 5th place, in the 1969–70 championship the team occupies 3rd place, in the 1970–71 championship the team occupies 5th place and in the 1971–72 championship, Universitatea Timișoara – after 58 years of supremacy from the teams from Bucharest – manages to bring the national title to Timișoara.

It is said that on 12 June 1972 (the day the team won the national title) the bells of the Metropolitan Cathedral in Timișoara rang one time more than usual, and on the second day at the gate of the boarding house where the majority of the rugby players of Universitatea Timișoara were living, on a board the following could be read: "Trecătorule, oprește-te un moment și înclină-te în fața ușii caminului unde trăiesc perlele rugby-ului românesc (translation: Passer-by, stop for a moment and take a bow in front of the door of the boarding house where the pearls of Romanian rugby are living)", the author of it being, at that time student, Nicolae Benga. Here are the artisans of this beautiful achievement: Duţă, Szasz, Cândrea, Peter, Suciu, Gheţu, Iacob, Ceauş, Tătucu, Nedelcu, Vollman, Rășcanu, Priess, Ionică, Ene, Malancu, Neiss, Popovici, Vlad, Ioniță, Arsene.

Chester Williams Era
In January 2012, former Springbok Chester Williams (the only non-white player in South Africa's winning 1995 Rugby World Cup team) joined Timișoara Saracens as head coach. His first attempt to get involved with Romanian rugby was being the technical director for CS Dinamo București. He was close to taking over the bench of Timișoara in the summer of 2011, but negotiations were put to a hold because of the World Cup that was taking place in New Zealand.

Williams brought Timișoara their first league title in 40 years in 2012. He was then replaced by fellow South African Danie de Villiers. In 2014, former New Zealand Heartland XV coach Grainger Heikell took over from De Villiers as head coach of Timișoara Saracens.

After two successful seasons for Timișoara, Chester Williams eventually returned to replace Danie de Villiers.

Romanian Cup
In 2011, Timișoara Saracens RCM UVT won the Romanian Cup for the first time, after a 32–10 victory against CSM Stiinţa Baia-Mare. The match took place in Alba Iulia, on the Cetate Stadium.
Timișoara Saracens won the Romania Cup once again in 2014 with a victory over CSM Stiinţa Baia-Mare on Cluj Arena, and went on to repeat their cup success in 2015 and 2016.

Romanian Rugby Championship (pre-2012) and SuperLiga (2012-)
In 2011, Timișoara Saracens RCM UVT finished in 3rd place. After losing 22–24 to CSM Știința Baia Mare in the semifinals of the Romanian Rugby Championship, the team from Timișoara won the 3rd place final against Farul Constanţa (15–11). Under Chester Williams' management, they won the league in 2012 and 2013.

In 2014, Timișoara lost against Farul Constanța in the league semi-finals, after the medical visas were allegedly ripped out of the files of Timișoara Saracen's top six players. This is one of many corruption accusations made by the team.

Timișoara Saracens won the league again in 2015 and 2016–17. These two finals, as well as the finals in 2012 and 2013, were played against CSM Știința Baia Mare. Timișoara won 8 out of 8 finals (in the SuperLiga, Romanian Cup and King's Cup) they played against Baia Mare.

During August 2020, it was announced that Timișoara Saracens RCM UVT will restart in the SuperLiga under the new name of SCM Timișoara Rugby.

Honours

Domestic
Liga Națională de Rugby:
Winners (6): 1972, 2012, 2013, 2015, 2016–17, 2017-2018
Runner-up (2): 1973 , 2019-2020
Third Place (7): 1974, 1975, 1990, 1991, 1992, 2011, 2014
Cupa României 
Winners (5): 2011, 2014, 2015, 2016, 2021
Runner-up (4): 1978, 1980, 2018, 2019, 2022
Cupa Regelui:
Winners (1): 2015
Runner-up (1): 2017

European
Energy Cup (Central and Eastern European Rugby Cup):
Winners (1): 2009
Runner-up (2): 2010, 2011

Current squad

Notable former players

  Sosene Anesi
  Stefano Clement Hunt
  Viliami Moala
  Hayden O`Donnell
  Tom Cox
  Brian Sefanaia
  Kevin Luiters
  Marzuq Maarman
  Lötter Pretorius
  Pieter Stemmet
  Johan van Wyk
  James Doyle
  Thomas Whitehurst
  Roberto Edmundo Tejerizo
  Mesake Doge
  Lemeki Nabalei
  Henry Seniloli
  Manasa Saulo
  Michael Stewart
  Edmund Aholelei
  Paea Fonoifua
  Sione Halalilo
  Kefu Ikamanu
  Semisi Mahe
  Mateo Malupo
  Samiu Muna
  Sione Taupaki
  Bidzina Shamkharadze
  Petru Bălan
  Ionel Badiu
  Stelian Burcea
  Valentin Calafeteanu
  Daniel Carpo
  Marian Drenceanu
  Victor Dumitru
  Daniel Ianuș
  Marius Iftimiciuc
  Paula Kinikinilau
  Mădălin Lemnaru
  Samuel Mariș
  Ionel Melinte
  Randall Morrison
  Cristian Pană
  Horațiu Pungea
  Jody Rose
  Vasile Rus
  Luke Samoa
  Laurențiu Tănase
  Alexandru Țăruș
  Jack Umaga
  Emiliano Calle Rivas
  Henri Boshoff
  Andrei Mahu
  German Aranda

Former coaches 
  Heikell Grainger
  Matt Williams
  Chester Williams

See also
 Rugby union in Romania

References

External links
 RCM Timișoara – Official club website
 http://www.itsrugby.co.uk/team-timisoara.html 

Romanian rugby union teams
Rugby clubs established in 1949
Saracens Global Network
1949 establishments in Romania